Roddy Manley (born 23 July 1965) is a Scottish former footballer. He mainly played in defence for Falkirk, St Mirren, Instant-Dict and Dundee.

References

1965 births
Living people
Footballers from Glasgow
Association football defenders
Scottish footballers
Falkirk F.C. players
Scottish expatriate sportspeople in Hong Kong
St Mirren F.C. players
Dundee F.C. players
Scottish Football League players
Scottish expatriate footballers
Expatriate footballers in Hong Kong